The Ministry of Higher Education, Science, Research and Innovation (Abrv: MHESI;), is a Thai government body responsible for the oversight of Higher education, research, and science and technology in Thailand.

Background
Ministry of Higher Education, Science, Research and Innovation is a Thai government ministry created the Act of Ministries, Bureaus, and Departments Improvement (No. 19), 2562 BE (2019), which took effect 2 May 2019 during the administration of Prime Minister Prayut Chan-o-cha.

Organization

Departments 
 Office of the Minister
 Office of the Permanent Secretary
 Office of Atoms for Peace
 Department of Science Service (DSS)
 Office of the Higher Education Commission
 Office of the National Research Council of Thailand

Supervised public organizations 
 National Science and Technology Development Agency
 National Institute of Metrology
 Office of the National Policy Higher Education, Science, Research and Innovation Council
 Geo-Informatics and Space Technology Development Agency
 National Astronomical Research Institute of Thailand
 National Innovation Agency
 Thailand Institute of Nuclear Technology
 Synchrotron Light Research Institute 
 Hydro and Agro Informatics Institute
 Thailand Center of Excellence for Life Sciences
 Thailand Science Research and Innovation

State enterprises 
 Thailand Institute of Scientific and Technological Research
 National Science Museum

See also
 List of government ministries of Thailand

References

 
Science and Technology
Science and technology in Thailand
Thailand
2019 establishments in Thailand
Government agencies established in 2019